Hypericum uralum is a species of flowering plant in the St. John's wort family Hypericaceae. Its native range includes China, Bhutan, India, Nepal, Pakistan and Myanmar.

References

uralum
Flora of China
Flora of the Indian subcontinent
Flora of Myanmar